The Hainan eastern ring high-speed railway is a high-speed railway on Hainan Island. It is operated by China Railway Guangzhou Group. Opened in December 2010, the railway links the capital Haikou at the northern end of the province, and goes alongside the eastern coastline to reach the resort city of Sanya in the southernmost region of the island. The railway share the end points with the Hainan western ring high-speed railway, which together creates a closed loop spanning 653 kms, as well as the world’s first circular high-speed railway, and allows passengers to travel around Hainan island (roughly same distance as circling Belgium) in about 3 hours.

History
The idea for the railway was first proposed in February 1958 by then Vice-Premier and Director of the National Planning Commission, Li Fuchun, during an inspection tour of Hainan. The original proposal was for a railway that would go completely around the island. It would incorporate several railway sections that had recently been, or were about to be, reconstructed in the southwestern part of the island (see Hainan western ring railway).

In February 1960, Premier Zhou Enlai visited Hainan and created a construction blueprint. In May 1963, Li Fuchun returned to inspect Hainan. His intention was for a ten-year plan to complete the railway. This was interrupted by the Cultural Revolution, and the plan was suspended.

In the summer of 1980, the State Council made the decision to speed up development and construction on Hainan Island.

The Guangdong–Hainan Train Ferry (part of the Guangdong–Hainan railway) was completed in December 2004, and the Hainan western ring railway along the western coast of the island from Haikou to Sanya was completed in 2005.

Preparation for the construction project in the eastern half of the island officially started in March 2006, with the National Development and Reform Commission officially approving the feasibility report on March 22, 2007. Construction began on September 29, 2007, and the railway went into service on December 30, 2010.

With a projected cost of over 22.22 billion RMB (approximately US$3.3 billion) shared between China's Ministry of Railways and the Hainan provincial government, this was Hainan's largest single investment project to date and employed a workforce of 50,000. Items of expenditure included 17.7 billion RMB on fixed assets and 1.5 billion RMB on trains.

The official opening and start of operations of the eastern ring railway took place on December 30, 2010 with a trial run. At the opening ceremony, Luo Baoming, governor of Hainan, stated that the railway will promote urbanization and greatly improve the island's transportation capacity.

The line was put into revenue service on January 7, 2011. The intercity service of the line, which is from Haikou to Meilan, was started to service on July 1, 2019.

Trains
The trains have since been transferred to Beijing Railway Bureau and are no longer in service.

Each train comprises eight cars, including five power cars, and three trailers. Passenger cars comprise two first-class and five second-class cars, and one dining car. The first-class cars are model Dingyuan 64, and the second-class cars are Dingyuan 92. The dining car provides fast food and drinks. Washrooms are designed to accommodate disabled people.

On November 18, 2016, new CRH1A-A EMUs entered into service, replacing the CRH1A units.

The CRH6F-A was put into service on July 1, 2019, with the opening of intercity service between Haikou and Meilan.

On January 31, 2021, 5 new Fuxing EMU was delivered from Guangdong–Hainan Ferry and it was put into service on February 1, 2021.

Operation

The railway runs from the Haikou Railway Station to Sanya Railway Station, although many trains terminate at Haikou East Railway Station.

The fare for a full journey between Haikou and Sanya is 173 RMB for a first-class seat, and 108 RMB for a second-class seat. Tickets can be purchased up to ten days in advance and are available at  station counters or from vending machines.

Schedule
Initially, there were ten trains per day in each direction on the Hainan eastern ring high-speed railway.

Since January 20, 2017, thirty-eight trains run in each direction on the Hainan eastern ring high-speed railway, of which twenty-nine are between Haikou or Haikou East and Sanya; five loop around the island from Sanya to Sanya, and four loop from Haikou East to Haikou East. For intercity service, there are thirteen trains run in each direction, of which seven are between Haikou and Haikou East; and six from Haikou to Meilan.

Ridership
In 2017, the entire Hainan ring high-speed railway (including the eastern and western halves) served 25.39 million passengers, a 3.62 million (16.6%) increase over 2016.

Stations
A total of 21 stations are already built or will be phased in gradually:

Haikou
Changliu
Xiuying
Chengxi
Haikou East
Meilan
Dongzhaigang ♦
Wenchang
Fengjiawan ♦
Qionghai
Bo'ao
Hele
Shangen ♦
Wanning
Shenzhou
Riyuewan ♦
Lingshui
Gaofeng ♦
Haitangwan ♦
Yalongwan
Sanya

Note: ♦ denotes Under construction or planned

See also 

 List of railways in China
 Transportation in China
 China Railway High-speed

References

External links

  Ministry of Railways
  Chinese Railways
 China Academy of Railway Sciences
 Hotline and other local station telephone numbers
 Route map

High-speed railway lines in China
Transport in Hainan
Railway lines opened in 2010
Standard gauge railways in China
2010 establishments in China
Airport rail links in China